Florin Mergea and Aisam-ul-Haq Qureshi were the defending champions, but Mergea chose to compete in Budapest instead. Qureshi played alongside Jean-Julien Rojer, but lost in the final to Feliciano López and Marc López, 6–7(5–7), 4–6.

Feliciano and Marc López became the first all-spanish team in winning the tournament since 1997.

Seeds

Draw

Draw

Qualifying

Seeds

Qualifiers
  Jaume Munar /  Tommy Robredo

Lucky losers

Qualifying draw

References

External links
 Main Draw
 Qualifying Draw

Barcelona Open Banco Sabadell - Doubles